Guirapembi Airport  was an airstrip near the hamlet of San Miguel del Monte Grande,  south of Santa Cruz de la Sierra, Santa Cruz Department, Bolivia.

Google Earth Historical Imagery beginning with (5/2003) show the field continually shortened with fencing and livestock outbuildings. (8/2016) shows hay bales and cattle pasturing in the field.

See also

Transport in Bolivia
List of airports in Bolivia

References

External links 
 Airport record for Guirapembi Airport at Landings.com

Defunct airports
Airports in Santa Cruz Department (Bolivia)